Musa River may refer to either of two languages of Papua New Guinea:
Yareba language
Baruga language